The Tennessee Bottle Bill is citizen-supported container-deposit recycling legislation, which if enacted will place a 5-cent deposit on beverage containers sold in Tennessee. The bill applies to containers made of aluminum/bimetal, glass or any plastic, containing soft drinks, beer/malt beverages, carbonated or non-carbonated waters, plain or flavored waters, energy drinks, juices, iced teas or iced coffees. Milk/dairy, nutritional drinks and wine and spirits are not included in the program.

The chief goals of the measure, recently rebranded TennCan, are to reduce litter, increase recycling, create green jobs, support sustainable manufacturing and generate funding, training and other benefits for social-service agencies, community causes and other nonprofit entities in Tennessee.

Proposed legislation
The proposed legislation has undergone numerous revisions since it was first introduced by two Republican legislators in 2003.

Need

RECYCLING: Tennessee consumes more than 5 billion beverage containers a year, according to the Container Recycling Institute, but recycles no more than 10 percent of them, according to the state's solid waste management agency. The proposed deposit-return legislation is projected to increase the recycling rate to approximately 80 percent, based on data in states with similar programs, while providing reliable quantities of high-quality recycled feedstock for manufacturers in Tennessee and the Southeast, especially those producing beverage cans, carpet, glass bottles and fiberglass.

LITTER: Tennessee spends an estimated $11 million a year on litter abatement. Its principal agency for litter collection is the "county litter grants" program within the department of transportation (TDOT). Since 1982, the program has used a "litter tax" on beverages to fund regular cleanups by work-release inmates from the county jails (the tax also funds Keep Tennessee Beautiful, the state affiliate of Keep America Beautiful.) From FY 2003–2004 to FY 2015–2016, litter grant collections averaged 23.5 million pounds a year, with a high of 28.7 million pounds in FY 2003-2004 and a low of 17.4 million pounds in FY 2005–2006. Removing those high and the low years, the average is just slightly higher, 23.7 million pounds, or an average 3.73 pounds per capita. These data do not include litter collections along interstate and federal highways performed by TDOT contractors, nor do they include cleanups performed by volunteers, Keep Tennessee Beautiful affiliates, neighborhood groups, the annual Great American Cleanup or other groups or events.

In order to put these numbers in context, the Tennessee Bottle Bill Project in 2006 sought to compare Tennessee's litter collections with those in Maine, which charges a 5-cent deposit on most beverages (15 cents on wine and spirits). Extrapolating from data provided by Maine's department of transportation (the only entity in the state that picks up litter on a regular basis), the Tennessee Bottle Bill Project determined that Maine's per-capita litter in 2006 was approximately one-quarter of a pound.

Moreover, according to informal assessments in 2006 by Maine DOT personnel, roughly 10-20 percent of Maine's litter consists of beverage containers. In contrast, the Tennessee Bottle Bill Project estimates that 50 percent or more of Tennessee's litter, by volume, is beverage containers. This estimate is based on estimates by numerous groups involved with litter cleanups in Tennessee, including county sheriffs, county litter-grant deputies, environmental organizations, watershed protection groups and others; as well as on the results of an informal source-separated survey conducted in November 2006 by the Tennessee Bottle Bill Project, using volunteers across the state, including several jail crews. That survey found that of 645.5 13-gallon garbage bags filled as full as possible, 325.5 contained bottles and cans only, or 50.42 percent.

How the proposed bill would work

Under the proposed legislation, the state's environmental agency will have ultimate responsibility for the program, with the department of revenue providing accounting functions as well as management of the "deposit beverage container fund." The fund is the account into which all initial deposits and other revenues are placed, and from which all program expenses are paid, including reimbursements and allowances. Any reserves in the fund, including unclaimed deposits, belong to the program, may not revert to the state's general fund and may be used only for purposes authorized by the legislation.

The 5-cent deposit is initiated by the beverage distributor and is collected by the department of revenue at the start of the cycle. The distributor recovers his deposit when he sells the product to a retailer; the retailer recovers his deposit when he sells the product to a customer; the customer recovers his deposit when he takes the empty container to a certified redemption center; the redemption center owner recovers his deposit when he sells the cancelled container to a certified processor; and the certified processor recovers his deposit when he invoices the bottle bill program for reimbursement.

Certified redemption centers are the heart of the program. They are independent businesses (storefront, portable, mobile, reverse vending machine or satellite kiosks) that have been authorized by the program to accept qualifying containers from the public, determine the quantity, issue the refunds, sort the containers by material and/or color (not by brand or bottler), and sell the sorted (and in some cases compacted) containers to a certified processor. The certified processor (typically a scrap yard, materials recovery facility, curbside recycling provider or dedicated collection and recycling service) then bales, shreds or otherwise adds value to the sorted containers before selling them to manufacturers or other processors.

In addition to paying market prices for the containers, the certified processor pays the redemption center the refund value of 5 cents plus an "overhead allowance" equal to 1 cent (maximum) per container. The processor then invoices the bottle bill program for the sum of these two amounts, as well as "administrative allowance" of one-tenth of a cent per container to defray his costs for associated paperwork and record-keeping.

Some redemption centers may be authorized as "depots," expanded facilities where the public may drop off non-deposit glass (such as wine bottles and food jars) as well as other recyclables, for instance, electronics.

Redemption centers may be owned by any entity meeting certification requirements, including individuals, retailers and other businesses, local government entities, including county solid waste convenience centers and not-for-profit organizations. The current version of the legislation (introduced in 2018) requires that every redemption center either be owned or operated by a nonprofit entity such as an agency serving the homeless or the handicapped, or it must maintain an ongoing "beneficial relationship" with at least one such entity in the area, such as a school, library, animal shelter or Little League team. "Beneficial relationship" will be defined by the program but may include hosting bottle drives or donation bins for the nonprofit.

Potential issues 
One aspect of beverage recycling laws that has come into question is illegal redemption from outside states. Michigan, which offers 10 cents for every can and bottle recycled, has faced issues of fraudulent returns from neighboring states. None of Tennessee's neighbor states currently has beverage deposit laws.

See also
Container-deposit legislation in the United States
Recycling in the United States

References

External links 
 Tennessee Bottle Bill Project
 The Bottle Battle
 Bottle Bill Resource Guide

Recycling in the United States
Proposed laws of the United States
Container deposit legislation